Florida's 105th House District elects one member of the Florida House of Representatives. The district is represented by David Borrero.

The district covers a portion of the Everglades over parts of Broward, Collier, and Miami-Dade Counties.

As of the 2010 Census, the district's population is 157,369.

Representatives from 1967 - Present

References 

105
Broward County, Florida
Collier County, Florida
Miami-Dade County, Florida